Eastville is a rural community in the Canadian province of Nova Scotia, located in  Colchester County. 
Alberta politician Edith Rogers was a notable resident.

References
Eastville on Destination Nova Scotia

Communities in Pictou County
General Service Areas in Nova Scotia